KNEK-FM (104.7 FM, "Magic 104.7") is a radio station playing an Urban AC format in the Lafayette area. It broadcasts under ownership of Cumulus Media.  Its studios are located on Galbert Road in Lafayette, and its transmitter is located south of Opelousas, Louisiana.

The station used to be owned by Citadel Broadcasting.  In 2007, Citadel transferred 11 of its radio stations (including KNEK-FM) to The Last Bastion Station Trust, LLC upon merger of many ABC Radio stations. However, in January 2008, Last Bastion Station Trust transferred KNEK-FM back to Citadel Broadcasting, effectively placing it back into the Lafayette cluster. In exchange for KNEK-FM, the trust received KRDJ. Citadel merged with Cumulus Media on September 16, 2011.

References

External links
Magic 104.7 - Official website

Radio stations in Louisiana
Urban adult contemporary radio stations in the United States
Cumulus Media radio stations